Juan Eduardo Fierro Rivera (born June 23, 1988 in Santa Cruz de la Sierra) is a Bolivian football who plays for Bolivian Primera División club Nacional Potosí and the Bolivia national team. He most often plays the role of a striker.

Eduardo is the son of former football defender Aldo Fierro, who played professionally for several teams in the Bolivian first division during the 1970s and 80's, as well as the Bolivia national team.

Club career
Fierro started his career in the youth ranks of Club Blooming, where he worked his way up to the first team. He made his debut in first division in 2005. During his first period with the millonarios he made most of his appearances coming off the bench, and he was also often hindered with injuries. In 2008, he went on loan to play for La Paz F.C. At his arrival he responded to the expectations with impressive displays. Fierro had a favorable season scoring 8 goals in 25 games. In 2009, Blooming gave him a second chance and brought him back to the club. He joined Brazilian club Oeste Futebol Clube in 2010.

International career
On February 6, 2013, Fierro made his debut for the Bolivia national team in a friendly match against Haiti, having substituted Carlos Saucedo right after the first half. He represented his country in 1 FIFA World Cup qualification match.

Honors

References

External links
 
 
 

1988 births
Living people
Sportspeople from Santa Cruz de la Sierra
Bolivian footballers
Bolivian expatriate footballers
Bolivia international footballers
Association football forwards
Club Blooming players
La Paz F.C. players
Oeste Futebol Clube players
Universitario de Sucre footballers
Club Bolívar players
Club Petrolero players
Sport Boys Warnes players
Nacional Potosí players
Bolivian expatriate sportspeople in Brazil
Expatriate footballers in Brazil
Bolivia youth international footballers